Ars-sur-Formans is a commune in the Ain department in the Auvergne-Rhône-Alpes region of eastern France.

Geography

The village is in the south-western part of the Ain department 33 km north of Lyon and 10 km east of Villefranche-sur-Saône in the heart of the Dombes region - known for its many lagoons. Ars-sur-Formans is on the Dombes plateau while to the west it borders the fertile hills of the Val de Saône. A small river, the Formans, runs from east to west across the commune just south of the village to join the Saône river near Saint-Bernard.

The D44 road from Savigneux west to Beauregard forms much of the northern border of the commune. Access to the village is by road D904 going west from Savigneux and continuing to join the D934 west of the commune. The road D888 also runs south-east of the village to Rancé.

Toponymy
The name of the commune comes from Arsa meaning "burnt". Long known simply as Ars, the commune changed its name to Ars-sur-Formans by a decree of 12 October 1956 published in the Official Journal on the 18th of the same month.

History
The name Ars appeared as early as the year 969. In the 11th century Ars was one of the many strongholds of the Lordship of Villars and his mansion was located next to the church. In 1226 Jean of Ars sold his land to the monastery of Île Barbe but Villars retained sovereignty. In the 14th century, the protection of the castle  was divided between the Lord of Villars and that of Beaujeu.

The village was burned by the troops of Viry in 1409 and was obliged to submit to the consequences of the Wars of Religion throughout the following century.

The parish of Ars belonged to the Principality of Dombes and the Châtellenie of Trévoux  before being absorbed with all of the Dombes, into the Kingdom of France in 1762.

In 1790 Ars was made a commune of the Ain Department. It was part of the canton of Trévoux until 1984, when it was attached to the canton of Reyrieux. In 2015 it became part of the canton of Villars-les-Dombes.
 
Since the mid-19th century, the name of Ars is associated with its canonized parish-priest, Saint Jean-Marie Vianney. Well before his 1925 canonisation by Pope Pius XI there were many pilgrimages. On 6 October 1986, Pope John Paul II travelled to the village of Ars-sur-Formans, during his third visit to France.

Heraldry

Administration

List of Mayors of Ars-sur-Formans

Twinning

Ars-sur-Formans has twinning associations with:
 Freihalden (Germany) since 1977.

Population

Culture and heritage

Civil heritage
The commune has many sites that are registered as historical monuments:
The Park on the Chemin de Chateau
The Girls' School and Orphanage of Providence (1827)
A House at Rue des Ecoles (19th century)
A School at Rue des Ecoles (1906)
A House at Rue Jean-Marie Vianney (19th century)
The Town Hall / School at Rue Jean-Marie Vianney (1840)
The Sainte-Philomène Garden at Rue Jean-Marie Vianney
The Chateau des Garets Park
The Sainte-Anne Farmhouse at Champ du Chateau (19th century)

Religious heritage
The commune has several religious buildings and structures that are registered as historical monuments:
The Croix des Combes (Combes Cross) (1853)
The Monumental Cross of the 1847 Jubilee (1847)
The Croix Micholet (Micholet Cross) (1612)
The Croix Tonneau (Tonneau Cross) (18th century)
The Presbytery for the Priest of Ars (18th century)
The former Church and Basilica (12th century)
The Garnier des Garets family Tomb (1856)
The Presbytery (1886)
The Presbytery of Saint Curé d'Ars (18th century) The Presbytery and the chapel containing the relic of the heart of Saint Curé are now a museum and open to visitors. The reception desk and the spiritual activities of the sanctuary are organised by the priests of the sanctuary: the congregation of Benedictine nuns called the Tyburn Nuns and the Brothers of the Holy Family of Belley. The year 2009 marked the Jubilee of the 150th anniversary of the death of Saint Jean-Marie Vianney. On the occasion of the sacred international year for priests 2009-2010 the sanctuary hosted nearly 600,000 pilgrims including 35,000 priests. The Historial du Saint-Curé-d'Ars revives the decor of the period and reconstitutes in 17 scenes and 35 wax figures the history of the Curé of Ars. Ars is part of the Association of sanctuaries in France, and holds the title "tourist village of Ain".
The Parish Church of Saint-Sixte (11th century) The Basilica of Ars, partly built in 1862 by the Lyon architect Pierre Bossan and his successor Sainte-Marie-Perrin, forms an extension to the old church. It houses the remains of Saint Jean-Marie Vianney, the parish-priest of Ars and the patron saint of all parish priests. This place of pilgrimage hosts more than 500,000 people each year.
The Tomb of the heart of Jean-Marie Vianney (1932)

The commune has a very large number of religious items that are registered as historical objects.

Local life

Religious communities
Several religious communities are present in Ars: the Working Missionary Sisters (Providence House), the Franciscan Sisters (Saint-Jean House), the Carmelite Sisters, the Benedictines of the Sacred Heart of Montmartre, the Brothers of the Holy Family of Belley (Guardians of the Sanctuary), the priests of the Jean-Marie Vianney Society (John Paul II Sacred Hall for the reception of priests and for International Seminar for the training of priests).

Events
On the second Sunday in February: Feast of the arrival of the Saint (evocation of the arrival of the Saint at the Meeting Monument, procession, solemn Mass, adoration of the blessed Sacrement, vespers with catechism)
the Sunday following Easter Sunday: Divine Mercy Sunday (Mass, education, Solemn Vespers ...
Every Wednesday in June: Groups of children at home (visit, Mass, games)
in May or June, Mass and Procession of Corpus Christi (feast) in the village;
4 August (anniversary of the death of the Saint): Festival of the Saint Curé (Lauds, Solemn Mass, Procession, Adoration of the Blessed Sacrament, Vespers, spiritual concert
8 December: feast of the Immaculate Conception, lighting the village and entertainments

Event at the Carmel of Saint Curé of Ars founded in 1939
In 1986 and 2007 the movie-art-recreation association made two films about Carmel of the Holy Curé of Ars in the movie series "Relief of France: the monasteries" and a paper on John Paul II during his meeting with the Carmelites on 6 October 1986.

Personalities
The commune is the homeland of Saint Curé of Ars - Jean-Marie Vianney.

See also
Communes of the Ain department

References

External links
Ars-sur-Formans Tourist Office 
Ars-sur-Formans Basilica (16 images) 
Ars-sur-Formans on Géoportail, National Geographic Institute (IGN) website 
Ars on the 1750 Cassini Map

Communes of Ain